Marya Martin is an American flautist with an active career as a soloist, recitalist, and chamber musician.

Born Mary Martin in New Zealand, Martin studied at the University of Auckland, where she had lessons with Richard Giese, then principal flute in the New Zealand Symphony Orchestra. After graduating in 1976, Marya was awarded a Queen Elizabeth II Arts Council grant to study at Yale University. In 1979, Marya graduated from Yale with a master's degree in flute performance.  She shortly thereafter won the 1979 Young Concert Artists International Auditions. She subsequently went on to win top prizes in the Naumburg Competition, the Munich International Competition, the Jean-Pierre Rampal International Competition, and the Concert Artists Guild—all within a two-year period. To date, Martin is the only flutist to take top prizes in all of these major competitions. In 1980, Martin made her New York concert debut. Following these successes, Martin decided to move to Paris to study with Jean-Pierre Rampal at the Nationale Superieur Conservatoire de Paris and then later with Sir James Galway in Lucerne, Switzerland.

In 1984, she founded the Bridgehampton Chamber Music Festival which, under her artistic direction, has done much to foster the development of chamber music presented in historically appropriate settings.

She has since performed throughout the world with some of the world's greatest orchestras including the Seattle Symphony, Saint Louis Symphony, the Brandenberg Ensemble, and the Mostly Mozart Orchestra. She has also made recital appearances at Carnegie Hall, the Royal Albert Hall and Wigmore Hall in London; the Sydney Opera House; Casals Hall in Tokyo; and other venues in Paris, New Zealand, and Australia. Martin has also toured extensively with James Galway playing duo concerts with him. As a chamber musician, Ms. Martin has appeared with the Chamber Music Society of Lincoln Center, Chamber Music at the Y, the Santa Fe Chamber Music Festival, Music at Angel Fire, and Bravo! Colorado. She has recorded for Musical Heritage Society, Orion Master Recording, Arabesque, New World Records, Well-Tempered Productions, Albany Records, and Kiwi Pacific Records. Martin currently serves on the board of Young Concert Artists and is an active jurist in international music competitions. She is also currently on the faculty of the Manhattan School of Music, a position she has had since 1996.

Martin is married to Manhattan businessman Ken Davidson.

References 

Year of birth missing (living people)
Living people
New Zealand emigrants to the United States
Yale University alumni
American classical flautists
University of Auckland alumni
Women flautists